Namak Halaal is a 1982 Indian masala film, directed by Prakash Mehra and written by Kader Khan. The film stars Shashi Kapoor, Amitabh Bachchan, Smita Patil, Parveen Babi, Waheeda Rehman, Om Prakash, Ranjeet, Satyen Kappu in pivotal roles. It features music composed by Bappi Lahiri, with lyrics written by Anjaan.

The film went on to be the third highest-grossing Indian film of 1982, grossing . It was remade in Telugu as Bhale Ramudu (1984) and in Tamil as Velaikaran (1987). The song "Raat Baaki" has been recreated by Tanishk Bagchi for the movie Ittefaq. The movie is most famous for the dialogue 'I can talk English, I can walk English, I can laugh English because English is a very phunny language.'

Plot

Bhim Singh (Suresh Oberoi) works as a manager and personal bodyguard to Seth Raja Singh (Kamal Kapoor) and saves him from many murder attempts planned by Raja's step brother, Girdhar Singh (Satyen Kappu). One day Raja Singh appoints Savitri (Waheeda Rehman), Bhim Singh's wife as trustee to their property and guardian to his toddler son Raja Kumar. On the same day, he and Bhim Singh die at the hands of Girdhar Singh. Savitri promises her husband that she would take care of Raja Kumar at any rate. Everyone including Bhim Singh's father Dashrath Singh (Om Prakash) blames Savitri thinking that she killed her husband and employer for money. Savitri hands over young Arjun to Dashrath Singh and settles herself as Raja Kumar's mother to protect him.

Later Arjun (Amitabh Bachchan) grows up to be a naive youngster under the care of Dashrath Singh. He moves to the city to build his life on his own and joins as a bellboy in a five star restaurant. There he meets Poonam (Smita Patil) and they both fall in love. That hotel is owned by Raja Kumar (Shashi Kapoor) and run by Savitri. Hotel manager Ranjit Singh (Ranjeet) is the son of Girdhar Singh and plans to kill Raja. They manage to show Savitri as a culprit and Raja believes that and suspects Savitri.

Gradually Arjun learns that Savitri is actually his, not Raja's mother and swears that he would protect Raja at any rate, just like his father did. Meanwhile, Raja meets a beautiful young dancer Nisha (Parveen Babi) and gets attracted to her. She is actually hired by Ranjit Singh to kill Raja, but Nisha falls in love with Raja and couldn't kill him. Finally she arranges a party on a boat to execute her plan, but Arjun foils it.

Finally goons kidnap Arjun's and Raja's family members and blackmail them to transfer all his property to Ranjit's name. Arjun and Raja beat all bad guys and save their loved ones. Raja marries Nisha and Arjun marries Poonam at the end and they reconcile with their mother Savitri.

Cast
 Shashi Kapoor   as Raja Singh
 Amitabh Bachchan as Arjun Singh
 Smita Patil as Poonam
 Parveen Babi as Nisha 
 Waheeda Rehman as Savitri Singh
 Om Prakash as Dashrath Singh "Daddu"
 Ranjeet as Ranjeet Singh
 Satyen Kappu as Girdhar Singh
 Viju Khote as Talvar Singh
 Ram Sethi as Bhairon
 Kamal Kapoor as Raja Sahib
 Suresh Oberoi as Bheem Singh 
 Ashalata Wabgaonkar as Nisha's Mother

Trivia
Raj Babbar was Prakash Mehra's original choice for the role of "Raja Singh", a role which eventually went to Shashi Kapoor.

Amitabh Bachchan portrays the protagonist Arjun Singh, who was influenced by the character Hrundi Bakshi, the protagonist of the 1968 Hollywood film The Party; Hrundi Bakshi is an Indian character who was portrayed by British comedian Peter Sellers.

Prakash Mehra's favourite actors Ranjeet and Satyen Kappu acted in this film after Laawaris.

Bappi Lahiri scored music for the first time for a Prakash Mehra film, after Kalyanji-Anandji association with Prakash Mehra in blockbusters like Muqaddar Ka Sikandar & Laawaris.

Awards 

 30th Filmfare Awards:

Won

 Best Male Playback Singer – Kishore Kumar for "Pag Ghungroo"

Nominated

 Best Actor – Amitabh Bachchan
 Best Supporting Actor – Shashi Kapoor
 Best Music Director – Bappi Lahiri
 Best Lyricist – Anjaan & Prakash Mehra for "Pag Ghungroo"

Soundtrack

The movie's soundtrack, which consisted of five songs, became a huge hit. Singer Kishore Kumar bagged his 5th Filmfare Award for Best Male Playback Singer for the song 'Pag Ghungroo Bandh'.

"Jawaani Jaan-E-Man Haseen Dilruba" went on to become a major hit. The intro to the song is similar to Sammy Davis Jr's Candyman melody. The main part of the song has similarities to Donna Summer's The Wanderer. "Raat Baaki, Baat Baaki", another song picturized on Parveen Babi, also became a big hit.

References

External links 
 

1980s Hindi-language films
1982 films
Films directed by Prakash Mehra
Films scored by Bappi Lahiri
Hindi films remade in other languages
1980s masala films